Indian Camp Run is a stream in the U.S. state of West Virginia.

Indian Camp Run most likely took its name from a nearby rock where Native Americans were known to camp.

See also
List of rivers of West Virginia

References

Rivers of Upshur County, West Virginia
Rivers of West Virginia